USS Eastern Shore (ID-3500) was a United States Navy cargo ship built for the United States Shipping Board by Harima Dockyard Company, Ltd., one of the yards of the Suzuki companies in Japan. The ship was acquired by the Navy after delivery at Seattle, Washington on 20 October 1918 and in commission from 1918 to 1919. The ship has been mistakenly been "also named" Eastern Soldier, a sister ship built in the same yard later. Eastern Shore is shown as still in service in 1945–1946.

Construction, acquisition, and commissioning
Eastern Shore was built as the commercial cargo ship SS Eastern Shore in 1918 by the Suzuki interests' Harima Dockyard Company, Ltd. (acquired by Suzuki in 1916 and expanded into large shipbuilding), at Harima, Japan, for the United States Shipping Board (USSB). The keel for Eastern Shore, first of a group of the largest vessels built by the company at 11,000 tons deadweight, was laid 5 February 1918 with launch on 12 August 1918 and delivery at Seattle, Washington on 20 October 1918. A smaller USSB vessel, Eastern King of 5,000 tons deadweight, had preceded Eastern Shore in January 1918 and the 11,000 deadweight Eastern Soldier followed along with another smaller ship, Eastern Pilot in 1919. The ship and builder were subject of a derogatory ditty, titled "What the Slipping Board Slipped onto us," apparently based on events during delivery to Seattle or shortly after delivery with a part reading:

The dynamos wandered around down below,There was nothing to hold the things fast;The winches paraded around the main deck,Some tried to climb the main mast.
and
For two days we wandered around Puget Sound,Humiliating the scenery there;
And on the third morning, without any warning,The engines went up in the air.

The close referred to the Chief "cussing" the man that designed "this nautical crime."  Supporting the reputed deficiencies is the note concerning repairs on the way to Europe: "After loading a cargo of flour at Seattle, Eastern Shore departed Puget Sound Navy Yard 2 January 1919, arriving New York 29 January for repairs." Despite any such faults, the ship survived the next war.

After she was converted for naval use at the Puget Sound Navy Yard at Bremerton, Washington, the Shipping Board transferred her to the U.S. Navy on 1 December 1918; the Navy in turn assigned her the naval registry identification number 3500 and commissioned her that same day as USS Eastern Shore (ID-3500).

Operational history
After loading a cargo of flour at Seattle, Washington, Eastern Shore departed the Puget Sound Navy Yard on 2 January 1919, arriving at New York City on 29 January 1919 for repairs. She got underway from New York on 10 February 1919 under direction from the United States Food Administration to proceed to Gibraltar for further orders; after arriving there, she was routed on to Constanţa, Romania, where she arrived on 15 March 1919. Her flour was discharged there to be rushed by barges up the Danube River to relieve starvation in Eastern Europe in the aftermath of World War I.

Taking aboard a special envoy of the Bulgarian government at Constanta as her sole passenger, Eastern Shore got underway on 10 April 1919 to return to the United States, stopping at Gibraltar before arriving at New York City on 18 May 1919. There she discharged her cargo and ballast and disembarked the Bulgarian envoy.

Decommissioning, disposal, and later career
Eastern Shore was decommissioned on 27 May 1919, and the Navy transferred her back to the U.S. Shipping Board the same day. She entered commercial service as SS Eastern Shore and continued operation under that name until scrapped in Baltimore in 1935. The ship appeared in Lloyd's Registers until 1952.

Confusion with Eastern Soldier/Lena Luckenbach
The line for ID # 3500 in the Naval History And Heritage Command's "SP" #s and "ID" #s — World War I Era Patrol Vessels and other Acquired Ships and Craft has Eastern Shore confused with this ship and sister ship Eastern Soldier: "Also named Eastern Soldier and, after 1922, Lena Luckenbach." This is countered by the description of the two ships built in different years in Pacific Marine Review of July 1920 and the fact that the 1944–1945 Lloyd's Register shows both ships existing at the same time and each with a different Official Number. Eastern Soldier/Lena Luckenbach was O/N 220589 and Eastern Shore was O/N 217291. Further, the Maritime Administration's Vessel Status Card dealing with Lena Luckenbach shows only the one previous name, Eastern Soldier with the fact the ship was "BLOCK SHIP SUNK" 1944.

References

Bibliography

External links
 Suzuki & Co.: Hirama Dockyard Co., LTD—Toba Ship Building Co., LTD—Teikoku Steamship Co., LTD (Advertisement, December 1919, featuring Eastern Shore with photo)

 

Auxiliary ships of the United States Navy
Ships built by IHI Corporation
1918 ships